Ochromolopis namibica is a moth in the family Epermeniidae. It was described by Reinhard Gaedike in 2004. It is found in Namibia.

References

Moths described in 2004
Epermeniidae
Moths of Africa
Lepidoptera of Namibia